The 1988 United States House of Representatives elections in Texas occurred on November 8, 1988, to elect the members of the state of Texas's delegation to the United States House of Representatives. Texas had twenty-seven seats in the House, apportioned according to the 1980 United States Census.

These elections occurred simultaneously with the United States Senate elections of 1988, the United States House elections in other states, the presidential election, and various state and local elections.

Democrats maintained their majority of U.S. House seats from Texas, flipping two seats from the Republicans, increasing their majority to nineteen out of twenty seven seats.

Overview

Congressional Districts

District 1 
Incumbent Democrat Jim Chapman ran for re-election.

District 2 
Incumbent Democrat Charlie Wilson ran for re-election.

District 3 
Incumbent Republican Steve Bartlett ran for re-election.

District 4 
Incumbent Democrat Ralph Hall ran for re-election.

District 5 
Incumbent Democrat John Wiley Bryant ran for re-election.

District 6 
Incumbent Republican Joe Barton ran for re-election.

District 7 
Incumbent Republican Bill Archer ran for re-election.

District 8 
Incumbent Republican Jack Fields ran for re-election unopposed.

District 9 
Incumbent Democrat Jack Brooks ran for re-election unopposed.

District 10 
Incumbent Democrat J. J. Pickle ran for re-election.

District 11 
Incumbent Democrat Marvin Leath ran for re-election.

District 12 
Incumbent Democratic Speaker of the United States House of Representatives Jim Wright ran for re-election.

District 13 
Incumbent Republican Beau Boulter retired to run for U.S. Senator.

District 14 
Incumbent Republican Mac Sweeney ran for re-election.

District 15 
Incumbent Democrat Kika de la Garza ran for re-election.

District 16 
Incumbent Democrat Ronald D. Coleman ran for re-election unopposed.

District 17 
Incumbent Democrat Charles Stenholm ran for re-election unopposed.

District 18 
Incumbent Democrat Mickey Leland ran for re-election.

District 19 
Incumbent Republican Larry Combest ran for re-election.

District 20 
Incumbent Democrat Henry B. González ran for re-election.

District 21 
Incumbent Republican Lamar Smith ran for re-election.

District 22 
Incumbent Republican Tom DeLay ran for re-election.

District 23 
Incumbent Democrat Albert Bustamante ran for re-election.

District 24 
Incumbent Democrat Martin Frost ran for re-election.

District 25 
Incumbent Democrat Michael A. Andrews ran for re-election.

District 26 
Incumbent Republican Dick Armey ran for re-election.

District 27 
Incumbent Democrat Solomon Ortiz ran for re-election unopposed.

References 

1988
Texas
United States House of Representatives